Rościsławice  is a small town in the administrative district of Gmina Oborniki Śląskie, within Trzebnica County, Lower Silesian Voivodeship, in Southwestern Poland.

References

Villages in Trzebnica County